The Daraina sportive lemur (Lepilemur milanoii) is a sportive lemur endemic to Madagascar.

L. milanoii is found in northern Madagascar, living in dry deciduous, gallery, and semi-evergreen forests. Its known distribution range covers the Loky-Manambato region and the species has surprisingly also been reported to occur in sympatry with L. ankaranensis in the Andrafiamena protected area, both areas being managed by the NGO Fanamby.
Daraina sportive lemur has been reported to occur at high densities in the forest fragments of Solaniampilana and Bekaraoka.

References

Sportive lemurs
Mammals described in 2006